James Peter Montgomery (born June 30, 1969) is a Canadian professional ice hockey coach and former player. He is the current head coach of the Boston Bruins of the National Hockey League (NHL), and formerly served as head coach of the Dallas Stars. During his playing career as a centre, he played in the NHL with the St. Louis Blues, Montreal Canadiens, Philadelphia Flyers, San Jose Sharks, and Dallas Stars.

Playing career
Montgomery played for the Cégep de Saint-Laurent Patriotes in Montreal in 1987-1988, before joining the Pembroke Lumber Kings, junior A hockey team in the Central Canada Hockey League in 1988-1989. The following season he joined the University of Maine and played 4 years with the team, winning numerous awards and establishing himself as one of the best prospects in hockey. Most notably he was named an All-Star 3 years (1991, 1992, 1993) and was named NCAA tournament championship MVP when he captained Maine to a record of 42–1–2 and the 1993 National Championship. His three third-period goals lifted the Black Bears to a 5-4 comeback win over Lake Superior State in the title game. Montgomery finished his career at Maine as the school's all-time leading scoring with 301 points on 103 goals and 198 assists. His number 19 was retired by Maine, one of three players who have that honour, the others being Hobey Baker Award winners Scott Pellerin (#8), and Paul Kariya (#9).

Following college, Montgomery was signed by the St. Louis Blues. For the 1993–94 season he skated in 67 contests and scored 20 points, both NHL career highs. Following the season the highly touted Montgomery was traded to the Montreal Canadiens for Guy Carbonneau. For the 1994–95 season however things did not work out and after just 5 games Montgomery was released by the Canadiens. Later in the year he was signed by the Philadelphia Flyers and skated in 8 regular season contests and 7 playoff contests with the Flyers. Montgomery is credited with nicknaming the dominant line of John LeClair, Eric Lindros, and Mikael Renberg the "Legion of Doom". The 1995–96 season saw Montgomery play only 5 games with the Flyers but he had a career year with the Flyers minor league affiliate Hershey Bears of the AHL. He scored 105 points in 78 games and was named to the AHL Second All-Star Team.

It would be another 4 years before Montgomery would return to the NHL. He played in the Deutsche Eishockey Liga (DEL) in Germany for the 1996–97 season, followed by two full years with the Philadelphia Phantoms. For The 1999–2000 season Montgomery played part of the year with the Phantoms and spent the majority of the year with the Manitoba Moose.

In 2000, Montgomery was signed by the San Jose Sharks. He played the majority of the 2000–01 season with the Kentucky Thoroughblades but also skated in 28 games with the Sharks. The following year he was signed by the Dallas Stars and played 9 games with the team over two years, spending most of his time with the Utah Grizzlies. Montgomery then played one year in Russia and one year with the Missouri River Otters before retiring in 2005.

Career statistics

Coaching career
Montgomery was an assistant coach for Notre Dame for the 2005–06 season. In 2006, Montgomery began a four-year stint as assistant coach at Rensselaer Polytechnic Institute. On April 12, 2010, he was named head coach of the United States Hockey League (USHL) expansion franchise Dubuque Fighting Saints. In the team's first year, Montgomery guided the Fighting Saints to a 37–14–9 record and the 2010–11 USHL championship with a three games to one victory over the Green Bay Gamblers. He went on to win the Clark Cup again during the 2012–13 season. In 2013, Montgomery was signed by University of Denver as head coach of their Pioneers men's ice hockey team and led them to a berth in the NCAA tournament. He led the Pioneers to the 2016 Frozen Four. In 2017, his fourth year as the head coach of the Pioneers, he led them to the National Championship game after establishing them as the first-seeded team in the country for the majority of the season. In 2016–17 season he was named the Spencer Penrose national coach of the year.

Dallas Stars (2018–2019)

On May 4, 2018, Montgomery was named as the head coach of the Dallas Stars of the National Hockey League (NHL). He led the Stars to their first playoff appearance in three years.

On December 10, 2019, the Stars fired Montgomery for "unprofessional conduct inconsistent with the core values and beliefs of the Dallas Stars and the National Hockey League." At a press conference, general manager Jim Nill said the situation had come to light the previous weekend, and involved "a material act of unprofessionalism" egregious enough to demand Montgomery's immediate firing. He did not offer specifics "out of respect for everyone involved," only saying that it did not involve abuse of players or criminal conduct. Rick Bowness, who joined the team a month after Montgomery's hiring in May 2018, was named interim coach, while Derek Laxdal (who was the head coach of the Texas Stars at the time) would be promoted to the assistant coaching position that was vacated by Bowness.

According to Sportsnet's Elliotte Friedman, Montgomery was fired for "a personal behaviour issue," and the Stars were not divulging details to protect the privacy of both the whistleblower and Montgomery's family. Montgomery told WFAA in Dallas that "there will be a time" when he speaks about the circumstances that led to his firing.

On January 3, 2020, Montgomery announced that he had checked himself into rehab to deal with alcohol abuse. He said that the Stars had made "an appropriate call" in firing him, and that his dismissal made him realize he was living a "damaging lifestyle." On January 7, the Fort Worth Star-Telegram reported that Montgomery was fired in part due to concerns about his drinking. Nill had reportedly confronted Montgomery on numerous occasions about drinking in public. The Stars had been aware of Montgomery's history with alcohol; he had been arrested for DUI in 2008 during his time at RPI.

St. Louis Blues (2020–2022)

On September 16, 2020, the St. Louis Blues signed Montgomery to a two-year contract, serving as assistant coach under Craig Berube.

Boston Bruins (2022–present)

On June 30, 2022, the Boston Bruins named Montgomery head coach, replacing Bruce Cassidy.

Head coaching record

NHL

NCAA

USHL

Awards and honours

1996: AHL Second All-Star Team

References

External links
 

1969 births
Anglophone Quebec people
Canadian ice hockey centres
Dallas Stars coaches
Dallas Stars players
Denver Pioneers men's ice hockey coaches
Hershey Bears players
Ice hockey people from Montreal
Kentucky Thoroughblades players
Living people
Maine Black Bears men's ice hockey players
Manitoba Moose (IHL) players
Montreal Canadiens players
Notre Dame Fighting Irish ice hockey coaches
Peoria Rivermen (IHL) players
Philadelphia Flyers players
Philadelphia Phantoms players
Rensselaer Polytechnic Institute faculty
Salavat Yulaev Ufa players
San Jose Sharks players
St. Louis Blues players
Undrafted National Hockey League players
Utah Grizzlies (AHL) players
Canadian expatriate ice hockey players in Russia
Canadian ice hockey coaches
NCAA men's ice hockey national champions
AHCA Division I men's ice hockey All-Americans